SNBA may refer to:

SN Brussels Airlines, a Belgian airline founded 2002 and merged in 2006 with Virgin Express to form Brussels Airlines
Sadar North Baptist Association, an association within the Tripura Baptist Christian Union
Société Nationale des Beaux-Arts, a group of French artists